The 2018 African Badminton Championships or All Africa Championships were held in Algiers, Algeria between 16-18 February, organised by the Badminton Confederation of Africa.

Medalists

Medal table

Men's singles

Seeds 

 Georges Paul (champion)
 Ahmed Salah (third round)
 Adham Hatem Elgamal (third round)
 Aatish Lubah (semifinals)
 Clement Krobakpo (semifinals)
 Abdelrahman Abdelhakim (third round)
 Emmanuel Donkor (quarterfinals)
 Habeeb Temitope Bello (final)

Finals

Top half

Section 1

Section 2

Section 3

Section 4

Bottom half

Section 5

Section 6

Section 7

Section 8

Women's singles

Seeds 

 Kate Foo Kune (champion)
 Dorcas Ajoke Adesokan (final)
 Hadia Hosny (semifinals)
 Aisha Nakiyemba (quarterfinals)
 Doha Hany (semifinals)
 Linda Mazri (third round)
 Halla Bouksani (quarterfinals)
 Zainab Momoh (quarterfinals)

Finals

Top half

Section 1

Section 2

Section 3

Section 4

Bottom half

Section 5

Section 6

Section 7

Section 8

Men's doubles

Seeds 

 Aatish Lubah / Georges Paul (second round)
 Abdelrahman Abdelhakim / Ahmed Salah (semifinals)
 Chongo Mulenga / Kalombo Mulenga (second round)
 Mohamed Abderrahime Belarbi / Adel Hamek (champion)

Finals

Top half

Section 1

Section 2

Bottom half

Section 3

Section 4

Women's doubles

Seeds 

 Doha Hany / Hadia Hosny (final)
 Halla Bouksani / Linda Mazri (semifinals)
 Aurelie Marie Elisa Allet / Kobita Dookhee (quarterfinals)
 Zainab Momoh / Peace Orji (semifinals)

Finals

Top half

Section 1

Section 2

Bottom half

Section 3

Section 4

Mixed doubles

Seeds 

 Emmanuel Donkor / Stella Koteikai Amasah (second round)
 Enejoh Abah / Peace Orji (final)
 Adham Hatem Elgamal / Doha Hany (semifinals)
 Koceila Mammeri / Linda Mazri (champion)

Finals

Top half

Section 1

Section 2

Bottom half

Section 3

Section 4

References

African Badminton Championships
African Badminton Championships
Badminton tournaments in Algeria
African Badminton Championships
2018 in Algerian sport